E. Page Halpin (born December 16, 1965), née E. Page Dunlap, is an American former professional golfer who was a member of the LPGA Tour for six years during the 1990s. Dunlap is best known for winning the individual NCAA Division I Championship in 1986.

Early years 

Dunlap was born in Harrisonburg, Virginia in 1965. Her parents Bunny and Bill were avid golfers, and she grew up playing the game. She attended Sarasota High School in Sarasota, Florida, and played for the Sarasota Sailors high school golf team. Dunlap was the state high school golf championship runner-up twice—as a junior in 1982, and again as a senior in 1983. She also found success as a junior amateur golfer by winning the Orange Bowl Junior Tournament in 1982 and the American Junior Golf Association tournament in 1983. She graduated from Sarasota High School in 1983.

College career 

Dunlap accepted an athletic scholarship to attend the University of Florida in Gainesville, Florida, where her older brother, Scott Dunlap, was already a member of the Florida Gators men's golf team. She played for coach Mimi Ryan's Florida Gators women's golf team in National Collegiate Athletic Association (NCAA) competition from 1984 to 1987, and was a member of the Lady Gators' back-to-back NCAA championship teams in 1985 and 1986. Dunlap was also a three-time collegiate tournament medalist, which included winning the Florida Intercollegiate Golf Championship in 1985, and shooting a 72-hole score of 291 to win the individual NCAA Division I Championship by a single stroke in 1986. She was a second-team All-American in 1985, a first-team All-American in 1986, and won the Broderick Award for Golf as the nation's outstanding female collegiate golfer in 1985–86.

Dunlap graduated from the University of Florida with a bachelor's degree in exercise and sports science in 1987, and was inducted into the University of Florida Athletic Hall of Fame as a "Gator Great" in 1998.

Professional career 

After turning professional, Dunlap played on the Futures Tour and won five tournaments. She then played on the LPGA Tour for six years (1991–1997), and had several top-ten finishes, but never won an individual Tour event. Her best finishes in the LPGA majors included a tie for thirty-fifth in the 1994 LPGA Championship, sixty-fourth in the 1997 U.S. Women's Open, and sixteenth in the 1994 du Maurier Classic. Dunlap's career earnings as a professional golfer totaled over $210,000; her best earnings year was 1993, when she won $59,053.

From 1998 to 2000, Dunlap served as the head coach of the Vanderbilt Commodores women's golf team, and one of her team members was the first-ever Vanderbilt University golfer to qualify for the NCAA Women's Golf Championship tournament as an individual. Dunlap left Vanderbilt to return to Florida to get married in 2000.

Dunlap has been inducted into the National Golf Coaches Association (NGCA) Players Hall of Fame.

Amateur wins 

1982 Orange Bowl Junior Tournament
1983 American Junior Golf Association Tournament
1985 Florida Intercollegiate Championship
1986 NCAA Division I Championship
2011 Florida Amateur

Professional wins

Futures Tour wins (5)
1988 (3) Costa Del Sol Classic, Turkey Creek Classic, Shalimar Classic
1990 (2) Lake Eufaula Futures Classic, Cellular One Futures Classic

See also 

List of Florida Gators women's golfers on the LPGA Tour
List of University of Florida alumni
List of University of Florida Athletic Hall of Fame members

References 

American female golfers
Florida Gators women's golfers
LPGA Tour golfers
Golfers from Virginia
Golfers from Florida
People from Harrisonburg, Virginia
Sportspeople from Sarasota, Florida
1965 births
Living people